Promineral S.A. is a Portuguese company owned by Renova SA.

Its main activity is the extraction and bottling of mineral still and sparkling waters of the dormant Furnas volcano in São Miguel, in the Azores archipelago. It currently employs c. 10 people with a support and decision center located in mainland Portugal. Although its origins can be traced back to 1890, this entity exists since 1999, after being acquired by the Portuguese paper company Renova SA.

History

The bottling of natural sparkling water in Serra do Trigo (Furnas, S Miguel Island, Azores) started by the end of the 19th century. The business was founded and early developed by the Machado family. The natural characteristics of these waters have earned it national and international prizes. Between 1895 and 1932, in Europe and in the Americas, it earned five gold medals, one silver medal and two ‘grand prix’ medals. The bottling of these waters has been temporarily shut down between the late 1970s to the late 1990s. Its activity has restarted in 1990, with renewed ownership, capitals and investment. During June 1990, the semi-automatic filling line was inaugurated, with a capacity for 2000 bottles per hour. A second investment was concluded in November 1994: the acquisition of the Gloria Patri still water spring. In October 1995 a flavored sparkling water line was launched (Pedras do Galego). New capital was raised in 1995 transforming the company in a SA (Anonimous Society - Sociedade Anónima - in Portuguese): Promineral SA. The first complete year of activity of Promineral SA was 1996 with over 2.5 million liters put in the markets, mainly in the Azores archipelago, all brands combined. This volume corresponded, at the time, to 56% of the Azorean Archipelago market share. Several difficulties have dictated the end of the production, a process that culminated in the sale of the company to Renova SA in 1999. 

Renova SA, is a Portuguese company owner of the leader brand of tissue paper products in Portugal (Renova), with a strong presence in Spain, France, Belgium, the United Kingdom and the Baltic countries and currently exported to over 65 countries (as per 2017). Renova has implemented several new investments in infra-structures, machineries and technical staff, in order to comply with the evolution of all the quality standards required by the Portuguese and European Union laws. A micro-biology laboratory, for example, was set in 2001. During 2004 new investments were done to increase the Gloria Patri spring production volumes from 6 cubic meters per hour to 30 cubic meters per hour. Over the years several investments have been made to increase the overall production capacity of the facility and quality preservation of the water born from the springs. Currently, an installed capacity of 10 million liters per year is in place. New investments have also been made after 2010 to improve all the aspects of the operation and respective branding in order to create a global enterprise comprising several brands of a unique resource: natural mineral waters, still and sparkling.

Economy of the Azores
Bottled water brands
1890 establishments in Portugal
1999 establishments in Portugal